Atanas Sapundzhiev (born 14 July 1950) is a Bulgarian boxer. He competed at the 1972 Summer Olympics and the 1976 Summer Olympics. At the 1976 Summer Olympics, he defeated Mahmoud Ahmed Ali and Viktor Ivanov, before losing to Mircea Șimon.

References

1950 births
Living people
Bulgarian male boxers
Olympic boxers of Bulgaria
Boxers at the 1972 Summer Olympics
Boxers at the 1976 Summer Olympics
Sportspeople from Sliven
Heavyweight boxers